Sīmanis is a Latvian masculine given name. Its name day is 5 January.

References

Latvian masculine given names